Love and Luck (French: L'amour et la veine) is a 1932 French comedy film directed by Monty Banks and starring Max Dearly, Ginette Gaubert and Olga Valéry. It is the French-language version of the British film Money for Nothing also directed by Banks but with a different cast. Such multiple-language versions were common in the early years of sound before dubbing came to be used more widely. The film's sets were designed by the art director Jean D'Eaubonne. It was one of the first films to premiere at the Grand Rex cinema in Paris which had been constructed by Jacques Haïk who also produced the film, and was a popular success.

Synopsis
Confusion arises about a gambler who has the same name as a millionaire.

Cast
 Max Dearly as Jeff Chester
 Ginette Gaubert as Jeanne Bermont
 Olga Valéry as 	Comtesse Sohoza
 Rachel Devirys as 	Nina Delaporte
 Carina as Femme de chambre
 Nita Alvarez as 	Audray
 Robert Ancelin as Jackson
 Henri Richard as Jack Chester 
 Paul Marthès as Maítre d'hôtel
 Robert Seller as 	Durant
 Gabriel Jacques as Tromboli
 Simone Lencret as 	Claudine
 Carjol as Bermont

References

Bibliography 
 Crisp, Colin. Genre, Myth and Convention in the French Cinema, 1929-1939. Indiana University Press, 2002.
 Smoodin, Eric. Paris in the Dark: Going to the Movies in the City of Light, 1930–1950. Duke University Press, 2020.

External links 
 

1932 films
1932 comedy films
French comedy films
1930s French-language films
Films directed by Monty Banks
French black-and-white films
1930s French films
Remakes of British films

fr:L'Amour et la Veine